

Gulf of Tendra or Tendra Bay is a shallow water bay off the coast of Ukraine (south of the Yahorlyk Kut peninsula), northern Black Sea. The gulf is separated from the sea by the Tendra Spit. The gulf is 45 km long, 7 km wide, and up to 6 m depth. 

It is included in the Black Sea Biosphere Reserve. From 1993 to 2003 it was included in the Montreux Record.

References

External links
 Tendriv Bay at the Encyclopedia of Ukraine
 Tendrivska Bay at the Ramsar Sites Information Service

Bays of Ukraine
Ramsar sites in Ukraine